"Move Your Body" is a song by Italian music group Anticappella, led by Gianfranco Bortolotti, the founder of Cappella. It features rapper MC Fixx and was released in 1994 as the fourth single from their only album, Anticappella (1998), becoming the group's most successful hit. The single charted in several countries, reaching the top 20 in Italy, Scotland and Spain, and top 30 in the UK, where it peaked at number 21. On the UK Dance Singles Chart, it peaked at number eight. It also charted in Ireland and France.

Critical reception
Alan Jones from Music Week wrote, "More frenetic Italian dance music, very similar in style to Anticappella's near-namesakes Cappella, with pounding rhythms, prominent keyboards, wailing diva and rap. Ideally suited to the Top 40." James Hamilton from the RM Dance Update described it as a "diva nagged archetypal commercial Euro galloper".

Track listing

 12", Italy (1994)
"Move Your Body" (Extended Mix)
"Move Your Body" (Radio Mix)
"Move Your Body" (Technotrance Mix)
"Move Your Body" (Acappella Mix)

 CD single, Australia & New Zealand (1994)
"Move Your Body" (Extended Mix) — 6:27
"Move Your Body" (Radio Mix) — 6:50
"Move Your Body" (Technotrance Mix) — 5:31

 CD single, France (1994)
"Move Your Body" (Radio Version) — 4:25
"Move Your Body" (Extended Mix) — 6:19

 CD maxi, Germany (1994) 
"Move Your Body" (Radio Mix) — 4:00
"Move Your Body" (Extended Mix) — 6:20
"Move Your Body" (Radio Extended Mix) — 6:40
"Move Your Body" (Technotrance Mix) — 5:30
"Move Your Body" (Acappella) — 1:21

Charts

References

 

1994 singles
1994 songs
English-language Italian songs
Eurodance songs
House music songs
Songs written by Gianfranco Bortolotti